Range Township is one of the fourteen townships of Madison County, Ohio, United States.  The 2000 census found 983 people in the township, 709 of whom lived in the unincorporated portions of the township.

Geography
Located in the southern part of the county, it borders the following townships:
Oak Run Township - north
Pleasant Township - east
Madison Township, Fayette County - southeast
Paint Township, Fayette County - south
Stokes Township - west
Paint Township - northwest

The village of Midway is located in southwestern Range Township.

Name and history
As of 1854, the population of the township was 988.  It is the only Range Township statewide.

Government
The township is governed by a three-member board of trustees, who are elected in November of odd-numbered years to a four-year term beginning on the following January 1. Two are elected in the year after the presidential election and one is elected in the year before it. There is also an elected township fiscal officer, who serves a four-year term beginning on April 1 of the year after the election, which is held in November of the year before the presidential election. Vacancies in the fiscal officership or on the board of trustees are filled by the remaining trustees.

References

External links
County website

Townships in Madison County, Ohio
Townships in Ohio